The 2020 Vanderbilt Commodores baseball team represented Vanderbilt University in the 2020 NCAA Division I baseball season. Vanderbilt competed in the Eastern Division of the Southeastern Conference (SEC). The Commodores played their home games at Hawkins Field. Coach Tim Corbin led the Commodores in his 18th season with the program.

Vanderbilt began the 2020 season with high hopes, having secured the second highest-rated recruit class for the season. In addition, the Commodores were highly ranked in preseason and subsequent polls, beginning at #1 according to the preseason ESPN/USA Today Coaches poll and closing at #7 on March 16, the final ranking.

Due to the COVID-19 pandemic, the future of the 2020 college baseball season, and the seasons of all spring sports, became unclear. On March 12, Vanderbilt University declared that all spring sports were suspended for the remainder of the season. On March 30, the NCAA canceled the upcoming College World Series, but announced that senior spring athletes would have the opportunity to return to school for the 2021 spring season if they wished.

Previous season

The Commodores finished 59–12 overall, and 23–7 in the conference. The Commodores were National Champions in 2019.

Personnel

Roster

Coaching Staff

Schedule and results

Schedule Source:
*Rankings are based on the team's current ranking in the D1Baseball poll.

2020 MLB Draft

References

Vanderbilt
Vanderbilt Commodores baseball seasons
Vanderbilt Commodores baseball